Senator Buford may refer to:

Carter M. Buford (1876–1959), Missouri State Senate
Tom Buford (1949–2021), Kentucky State Senate